Parramatta is an electoral district of the Legislative Assembly in the Australian state of New South Wales. It is currently held by Geoff Lee of the Liberal Party.

Parramatta is an urban electorate in Sydney's inner north-west, roughly analogous to the City of Parramatta, taking in the suburbs of Camellia, Carlingford, Dundas, Dundas Valley, Ermington, Granville, Harris Park, Melrose Park, North Parramatta, North Rocks, Oatlands, Parramatta, Rosehill, Rydalmere, Telopea and Westmead.

History

Parramatta is the only electorate to have existed continuously since the first Legislative Assembly election in 1856. It elected two members simultaneously from 1856 to 1880. In 1920, it absorbed Granville and elected three members under proportional representation. In 1927, it was divided into the single-member electorates of Parramatta, Granville and Auburn.

For most of its single member history since 1927 and prior to 2011 Parramatta was a safe Labor Party seat. Prior to 2011 it was last held by the Liberals by John Books from 1988 to 1991. The Liberal Party had hopes of winning back the seat at the 1994 by-election when it was a marginal ALP seat but the ALP retained the seat with a huge swing towards it.

Labor went into the 2011 election holding the seat with a margin of 13.1 percent, but Liberal challenger Geoff Lee won it on a swing of 25.8 percent, turning it into a safe Liberal seat in one stroke. He was reelected in 2015, the first time in over 80 years that the Liberals (or their predecessors) have been reelected in the seat's single member incarnation.

Members for Parramatta

Election results

References

Parramatta
Parramatta
1856 establishments in Australia